Operation Michoacán is a joint operation by Federal Police and the Mexican military to eliminate drug plantations and to combat drug trafficking. Initiated on December 11, 2006, the operation was supervised by The Secretary of Public Safety, Attorney General of Mexico, Secretary of the Interior, Mexican Navy and Mexican Army.

On some occasions, state and municipal police have participated despite not being part of it. The joint operation has distinguished itself as one of the operations against organized crime, drug trafficking in this case, which has employed the largest number of military and police elements, as well as most state forces.

Background
The drug war in Michoacán started during the 1990s as the Milenio Cartel and the Amezcua Cartel  would sell crystal methamphetamine imported from Colombia due to alliances with the Medellín Cartel and the Cali Cartel. Shortly after, lieutenants in the Milenio Cartel betrayed them and went to work for the Gulf Cartel which was another key distributor of Colombian drugs in Mexico. In 2003, as the drug trade grew big in Michoacán, the gulf cartel gave authority to a newly formed enforcer group called Los Zetas. The Zetas and Gulf cartels had allies with a  newly formed vigilante group called La Familia Michoacana. They planned various acts of drug related crime across Michoacán including a 2004 prison break in Apatzingán to breakout members of the gulf and zetas cartels. Following Carlos Rosales Mendoza being detained for his part in the prison raid, Nazario Moreno took control of La familia declaring a turf war on rival cartels in the state of Michoacán resulting in the start of the drug war. Following up on an operation planned by predecessor, Vicente Fox, on December 12, President Felipe Calderón ordered the military to send 4,000 troops to his home state of Michoacán, where drug-related crime had left over 500 dead. Troops were assigned to areas under the control of organized criminals, conducting raids, making arrests and establishing control points on highways and secondary roads. In 2007 May 8 in Apatzingan, Michoacán, Soldiers from the 51st Infantry Battalion engaged drug traffickers. Soldiers driving HMMWV armed with Mk 19 grenade launchers killed 4 cartel gunmen, 3 soldiers were reported wounded.

2009

Local government officials arrested
 In May 2009,  federal officers detained 10 mayors of Michoacán and 20 other local officials suspected of being associated with the cartel

Arrest of Arnoldo Rueda and retribution
 On July 11, The Federal Police trapped and arrested one of three of La Familia leaders. Arnoldo Rueda Medina a.k.a. La Minsa is one of three cartel lieutenants was captured in Morelia, Michoacán. On the same day as a response to the capture of Arnoldo Rueda, La Familia launched the biggest attacks in the history of organized crime against Federal Police and Military installations in 8 cities in the western part of Mexico. Even attacking the Federal Police building where Arnoldo was held in. Cartel hitmen were reported using fragmentation grenades, AK-47's and AR-15's in. Three Federal Police officers, two soldiers were reported killed and 18 wounded.
 On July 14, the bodies of 12 Federal Police officers that were investigating criminal activity in the area were found murdered and abandoned along a highway between Lázaro Cárdenas and Morelia

Government response

 On July 17, as a response to the violence, the federal government stepped up a plan to "surround" Michoacán by sea, air and land. The government sent 5,500 soldiers and federal police officers, also arriving were fully armed helicopters and vehicles to reinforce the 7,000 government forces already deployed in the state. Furthermore, 25 bases will be deployed for mobile operations on freeways and highways of the first order, which brings to Michoacán in adjacent areas of the states of Guanajuato, Guerrero, Colima, and Jalisco, where troops are participating in the various areas adjacent to the 12th Military Region. The government is considering building 67 mobile bases of operation, nine of joint operations by personnel of the Army and Federal Police, strengthening air support aircraft both fixed wing and rotary wing.

 On July 21, The army completed the reinforcement of "Joint Operation Michoacán" with 2,500 troops to assist the deployed 1,000 troops already in the state. Also the Secretariat of the Navy announced that the navy launched sea, air, and land surveillance operations at the coast and also sent 1,500 marines.
 On July 30, The Federal Police arrested "La Familia's" financial operator Armando Quintero Guerra a.k.a. "El Licenciado"(The Bachelor) and the cartels alleged leader Servando "La Tuta" Gomez girlfriend Lourdes Medina Hernández in Uruapan. The PFP also captured another financial operator of Nazario Moreno González a.k.a. "El Chayo".

Ongoing confrontations
 On July 30, SEDENA has reported that 6 cartel gunmen were killed in a confrontation with troops in the town of Guayameo in the municipality of Zirándaro. Soldiers from the 21st military zone were "attacked with firearms inside a home, so they proceeded to repel aggression." military officials said.
 On August 15, Federal Police forces captured a boss of La Familia, along with other 7 lieutenants. Héctor Manuel Oyarzabal Hernández a.k.a. "El Héctor" was in charge of the municipalities of Ixtapaluca, Chalco, Valle de Chalco and Ozumba in the State of Mexico. The operation succeeded without a shot being fired.
 On August 25, Federal Police forces captured Manuel Alejandro Sotelo Barrera a.k.a. "El Bolucho". He is supposed leader of La Familia's Leon, Guanajuato chapter and nephew of Servando Gómez a.k.a. "La Tuta". On the same day the military captured Luis Ricardo Magaña Mendoza a.k.a. "El 19 y medio" (19 and a half) another leader of the cartel and five other cartel members in Manzanillo, Colima.

2010
 January 8 – during a routine patrol,  troops were attacked by gunmen in a pickup vehicle, provoking a gunfight that lasted for various minutes in Michoacán. Four gunmen and one soldier were killed.
 January 30 – Five Federal Police officers were ambushed by gunmen while traveling on the Highway Occidente; seven federal officers were reported injured. The government scrambled federal helicopters, troops, and state police to find the ones responsible.
 April 24 – A three vehicle convoy carrying the Public Safety Secretary was attacked by gunmen which left two bodyguards and two bystanders dead. Hours later a police station in Morelia was attacked by grenades. The explosion damaged three vehicles.
 June 14 – Ten Federal Police officers were ambushed and killed while several others were injured during a firefight in Zitácuaro. The Federal Police managed to kill and injure the gunmen who are presumed to be part of La Familia Michoacana cartel. Immediately after the gunfight, army air and land units were dispatched to secure the area.
 June 16 – After the June 14 ambush attack on Federal Police officers, the Mexican Army doubled patrols in the rural areas of Zitácuaro.
 November 5 – After a suspected drug leader was trapped in Tzurumútaro (a little town located near Morelia), a series of consecutive attacks took place in Morelia. There, attacks consisting of narcobloqueos (narcoblocks, a series of run blocks) with cars on fire, with gunfights between the Federal Police, Mexican Army and gang members.

2012
 February 3 – 4,000 additional Mexican Army troops arrive to the state of Michoacán. Troops were assigned to areas under the control of Knights Templar Cartel.

2013
 May 22 - 6,000 Mexican Army troops arrive to the town of La Ruana, Michoacan to assigned raids and patrolling in the town under the control of the Knights Templar Cartel.

2014
 January 22 - Enrique Plancarte Solís's daughter flees Mexico to her home in Chicago, IL due to posing a selfie on Twitter wearing a nun's costume that resembles the Knight's Templar Cartel coat of arms.
 January 26 - Vigilante group legally joins Federal Police and Army. 
 January 27 - Dionisio Loya Plancarte is captured. 
 February 2 - Enrique Plancarte Solís's lawyer is captured. 
 February 8 - Self-Defense group reclaims Apatzingan. Antonio Plancarte Solís is captured.

2015
February 27-Servando Gomez Martinez is captured by Federal Police, PGR, and SEIDO agents in Morelia.

2016
 September 6 – a Mexican cartel gang shoots down a helicopter in the western state of Michaocán. The helicopter was shot down in the region of Apatzingán, a city located in Tierra Caliente (Hot Land), a region that has been beset by drug violence and vigilante justice for years.

Controversy
Operation Michoacán is the first stage of the so-called War Against Drug Trafficking implemented by the federal government of President Felipe Calderón. The joint operation has been questioned about the human rights violations that may have occurred, given the military presence among the civilian population of the state of Michoacán. The chairman of the National Commission on Human Rights, José Luis Soberanes, in May 2007, charged that had been at least 53 complaints of human rights violations by the military to the civilian population.

References

2000s in Mexico
2010s in Mexico
History of Michoacán
Battles of the Mexican drug war
Operations against organized crime in Mexico
La Familia Michoacana